Bheja Fry may refer to:
 Bheja Fry (film series)
 Bheja Fry (film), 2007 film
 Bheja Fry 2, a 2011 sequel to the 2007 film